Fischbach is a river of the Ammergau Alps, southwest of Oberammergau, in Bavaria, Germany and at the border between Bavaria and Tyrol, Austria.

The Fischbach is the left headwater of the Linder.

See also
List of rivers of Bavaria
List of rivers of Austria

References

Rivers of Bavaria
Rivers of Tyrol (state)
Ammergau Alps
Rivers of Austria
Rivers of Germany
International rivers of Europe
Austria–Germany border
Border rivers